Francys Arsentiev (January 18, 1958 – May 24, 1998) became the first woman from the United States to reach the summit of Mount Everest without the aid of bottled oxygen, on May 22, 1998. She then died during the descent.

Early life, education and career

Francys Yarbro Distefano-Arsentiev was born Francys Yarbro, on January 18, 1958, in Honolulu, Hawaii, to John Yarbro and his wife Marina Garrett. At age six, her father took her to the Colorado mountains. Growing up, she attended The American School in Switzerland and schools in the United States. Arsentiev attended Stephens College before ultimately graduating from the University of Louisville. She then received a Master's degree from the International School of Business Management in Phoenix. Arsentiev worked as an accountant in Telluride, Colorado during the 1980s.

Climbing
In 1992, Yarbro married Sergei Arsentiev. Together, they climbed many Russian Peaks, including the first ascent of Peak 5800m, which they named Peak Goodwill, as well as Denali via the West Buttress. Arsentiev became the first U.S. woman to ski down Elbrus, and she summitted its east and west peaks. By this time, she had developed an interest in becoming the first U.S. woman to summit Everest without the use of supplemental oxygen.

Everest

Initial attempts
In May 1998, Francys and Sergei Arsentiev arrived at base camp, Mount Everest. On May 17, they ascended from Advance Base Camp to the North Col, and the following day they reached 7700 m (25,262 ft) as 21 other climbers reached the summit of Everest from the North. On May 19, they climbed to 8,203 meters (27,000') (Camp 6). Sergei reported by radio that they were in good shape and were going to start their summit attempt on May 20 at 1:00am. On May 20, after spending the night at Camp 4, they started their summit attempt but turned around at the First Step when their headlamps failed. On May 21, they again stayed at Camp 6, after ascending only 50–100 meters (200' to 300') before turning around.

Summit and aftermath
After these two aborted attempts on the summit, they began their final ascent on May 22. Due to the absence of oxygen supplementation at such high altitude, the two moved slowly and summitted dangerously late in the day. As a result, they were forced to spend yet another night above 8,000 meters (26,000'). During the course of the evening, the two became separated. Sergei made his way down to camp the following morning, only to find that his wife had not yet arrived.  Realizing she had to be somewhere dangerously high upon the mountain, he set off to find her, carrying oxygen and medicine.

Details of what happened next are uncertain, but the most plausible accounts suggest that on the morning of May 23, Francys Arsentiev was encountered by an Uzbek team that was climbing the final few hundred meters (yards) to the summit. She appeared to be half-conscious, affected by oxygen deprivation and frostbite. As she was unable to move on her own, they attended to her with oxygen and carried her down as far as they could, until, depleted of their own oxygen, they became too fatigued to continue the effort. Francys was still alive. As the Uzbek climbers made their way down to camp that evening, they encountered Sergei Arsentiev on his way back up to her. This is the last time he was seen alive.

Death
On the morning of May 24, Briton Ian Woodall, South African Cathy O'Dowd, and several more Uzbeks encountered Francys Arsentiev while on their way to the summit. She was found where she had been left the evening before. Sergei Arsentiev's ice axe and rope were identified nearby, but he was nowhere to be found. Both Woodall and O'Dowd called off their own summit attempts and tried to help Francys for more than an hour, but because of her poor condition, the perilous location, and freezing weather, they were forced to abandon her and descend to camp. She died as they found her, lying on her side, still clipped onto the guide rope. She was aged 40, with one son. Her corpse had the nickname "Sleeping Beauty".

The mysterious disappearance of her husband was solved the following year when Jake Norton, a member of the 1999 "Mallory and Irvine" expedition, discovered Sergei's body lower on the mountain face, apparently dead from a fall while attempting to rescue his wife.

"The Tao of Everest"
Woodall initiated and led an expedition in 2007, "The Tao of Everest", with the purpose of returning to the mountain to bury the bodies of Francys Arsentiev and an unidentified climber ("Green Boots"), both of whom were plainly visible from the nearby climbing route.  Francys Arsentiev's body was visible to climbers for nine years, from her death, May 24, 1998, to May 23, 2007. On May 23, 2007, Woodall was able to locate Arsentiev's body, and after a brief ritual, dropped her to a lower location on the face, removing the body from view. In 2014, "Green Boots" was moved to a less conspicuous location by a Chinese team.

See also

List of people who died climbing Mount Everest
Timeline of climbing Mount Everest
Junko Tabei (Japan), the first woman to reach the summit of Mount Everest (16 May 1975).
Wanda Rutkiewicz (Poland), the first European woman to reach the summit of Mount Everest (16 October 1978).
Hannelore Schmatz (Germany), the first woman to die on Mount Everest (2 October 1979).
Sharon Wood (Canada), the first North American woman to reach the summit of Mount Everest (20 May 1986).
Stacy Allison (U.S.), the first U.S. woman to reach the summit of Mount Everest (29 September 1988).
Melissa Arnot (U.S.), the first U.S. woman to reach the summit of Mount Everest and survive the descent without bottled oxygen (2016).

Notes

External links
Portrait of Francys Arsentiev

1958 births
1998 deaths
Mountaineering deaths on Mount Everest
American summiters of Mount Everest
American female climbers
American mountain climbers
Sportspeople from Honolulu
Stephens College alumni
University of Louisville alumni
American expatriates in Switzerland
20th-century American women
20th-century American people